Soul Man may refer to:

People
Soulman Alex G, nickname of professional wrestler Alex Gibson
"Soul Man" Rocky Johnson (1944–2020), American professional wrestler
Soulman (memoir), by Rocky Johnson with Scott Teal
Soul music aficionado

Music
The Soul Man!, a 1966 album by Bobby Timmons
Soul Man - Live in Japan, by Otis Clay
Soul Man (album), a 2006 album by X Factor runner-up Andy Abraham
"Soul Man" (song), a 1967 hit song by Sam & Dave written by Isaac Hayes and David Porter
"Ben l'Oncle Soul" ("Soulman"), a 2010 song by French musician Ben L'Oncle Soul written by Ben L'Oncle Soul, Gabin Lesieur, Freddi Chellaoui

Film and television
Soul Man (film), a 1986 film starring C. Thomas Howell
Soul Man (TV series), a sitcom starring Dan Aykroyd
The Soul Man, a sitcom starring Cedric the Entertainer

See also
Soul Men, an American musical comedy film
The Soulmen, a Slovak rock band